Oliver M. Hazen High School is a public secondary school located in the Renton Highlands of Renton, Washington, in the greater Seattle area.

Activities 
The school is home to the Hazen High School Table Tennis Club.

Notable alumni
 Joe Tryon-Shoyinka (born 1999), American football player

References

External links
 

High schools in King County, Washington
Education in Renton, Washington
Educational institutions established in 1968
Public high schools in Washington (state)